The 2007 WNBA season was the 11th season for the franchise and their 5th season in San Antonio. The team went to the playoffs for the first time in five years, losing in the conference finals to eventual champion Phoenix Mercury.

Offseason

Dispersal Draft

WNBA Draft

Jessica Davenport was selected by San Antonio, but due to trade rights, she was later traded to the New York Liberty.

Regular season

Season standings

Season schedule

Player stats

References

San Antonio Stars seasons
San Antonio